Pinch point may refer to:
 Pinch point (economics), the level of inventories of a commodity or product below which consumers become concerned about security of supply
 Pinch point (mathematics), a type of singular point on an algebraic surface
 Pinch point bar, a hand tool consisting of a long, straight metal bar
 Curb extension, a traffic calming measure consisting of an angled narrowing of the roadway
 The point of closest approach between the hot and cold composite curves in pinch analysis
 Pinch point hazard, a mechanical hazard produced by objects coming together.

See also
 Bottleneck (disambiguation), various meanings including a phenomenon where the performance or capacity of a system is limited by one component or resource
 Pinch (disambiguation)